Refinery row could refer to:

Canada

Refinery Row (Edmonton), Alberta

United Kingdom

Lindsey Oil Refinery, North Lincolnshire, England

United States

Houston Ship Channel, Houston, Texas

See also
List of oil refineries